The 2013 Men's Oceania Cup was the eighth edition of the men's field hockey tournament. It was held from 30 October to 3 November in Stratford.

The tournament served as a qualifier for the 2014 FIH World Cup.

Australia won the tournament for the eighth time, defeating New Zealand 5–2 in the final. Papua New Guinea finished in third place, defeating Samoa 3–0.

Teams

Results
All times are local (NZDT).

Preliminary round

Pool

Fixtures

Classification round

Third and fourth place

Final

References

External links

2013
2013 in field hockey
2013 in Australian field hockey
2013 in New Zealand sport
2013 Oceania Cup
Oceania Cup